Shirley Gee (born 25 April 1932, London; died 22 November 2016, London) was a British playwright.

Life
She married actor Donald Gee on 30 January 1965; They have two sons; Joby (born in 1966) and Daniel (1968) and six grandchildren (in age order); Barney, Elliot, Harvey, Maisy, Ethan and Hal. She lived in Chelsea from 1965 to 2009.  She then lived in Putney, London with her husband, until her death.

Awards
Never In My Lifetime won the Samuel Beckett Award, 1985 Susan Smith Blackburn Prize, and the 1983 BBC Giles Cooper Award.
 
She also won the 1979 BBC Giles Cooper Award, for Typhoid Mary.

Her play: Stones was runner up in the 1975 Radio Times Drama Awards.

Works

Plays
, 1986
 1984
Typhoid Mary, 1983
 1989

Anthologies

Radio plays
 Stones, 1974;
 The Vet's Daughter, adapted from the novel by Barbara Comyns, 1976;
 Moonshine, 1977;
 Typhoid Mary, 1979;
 Bedrock, 1979;
 Men on White Horses, adapted from the novel by Pamela Haines,1981;
 Our Regiment, a documentary, 1982;
 Never in My Lifetime, 1983;
 Against the Wind, 1988, based on the life of Hannah Snell.

Teleplays
 Long Live the Babe, 1984,
 Flights, 1985.

References

External links
Shirley Gee, doollee
Shirley Gee Radio Plays 

1932 births
English dramatists and playwrights
2016 deaths